Ingoldsby is a small village in the South Kesteven district of Lincolnshire, England. The village contains approximately 121 households.

Ingoldsby is a civil parish and an ecclesiastical parish. The ecclesiastical parish is part of The North Beltisloe Group of parishes in the Deanery of Beltisloe. From 2006 to 2011 the incumbent was Rev Richard Ireson. The parish church is dedicated to St Bartholomew.

Ingoldsby is situated midway between Grantham and Bourne. Adjacent villages include Great Humby, Lenton, Bitchfield and Boothby Pagnell. The population of the parish is 254. Close by to the east of the village is the Roman road King Street that ran from Bourne to near Ancaster.

Adjacent to the village is the minor hamlet of Scotland, and Scotland House. They are connected by Scotland Lane.

Ingoldsby forms the most southerly point of the Ropsley Triangle, which denotes the area between Ropsley, Boothby Pagnell and Ingoldsby.

References

External links

"Ingoldsby", Genuki. Retrieved 4 February 2014
 "Ingoldsby Parish Council", Cpalc.org.uk
 Ingoldsby Primary school web site

Villages in Lincolnshire
Civil parishes in Lincolnshire
South Kesteven District